Makarovsky (masculine), Makarovskaya (feminine), or Makarovskoye (neuter) may refer to:

 Makarovsky District, a district of Sakhalin Oblast, Russia
 Makarovsky Urban Okrug, the municipal formation into which it is incorporated
 Makarovsky (rural locality), rural localities in Russia called Makarovsky, Makarovskaya, or Makarovskoye

See also
 Makar (disambiguation)
 Makarov (disambiguation)